Neville Vivian Bothe (born 8 February 1970) is a Seychellois football manager, currently managing the Seychelles.

Managerial career
In September 2021, following stints as manager of St Michel United and assistant manager of the Seychelles, Bothe was appointed manager of the Seychelles. Two months after Bothe's appointment, the Seychelles won the 2021 Four Nations Football Tournament.

References

Living people
1970 births
Seychellois football managers
Seychelles national football team managers